The Helena Confederate Cemetery is located in the southwest corner of the Maple Hill Cemetery on Holly Street in Helena, Arkansas.  It is a small section of the larger cemetery, under one acre in size, and is marked by two significant memorials: the Confederate Memorial and the memorial to Confederate Army General Patrick Cleburne, whose burial here is the only known place associated with his life.  The Cleburne memorial is a marble shaft  in height, topped by an urn with flames coming from its top.  The Confederate Memorial is a marble depiction of a soldier, mounted on a  granite shaft, surrounded by pyramids of cannonballs and inverted cannons.  The cemetery has more than 100 marked graves, 15 of which are unidentified Confederate dead, and 23 are of those killed in the 1863 Battle of Helena.

The cemetery was listed on the National Register of Historic Places in 1996.

See also
 National Register of Historic Places listings in Phillips County, Arkansas

References

External links
 
 

Arkansas Heritage Trails System
Cemeteries on the National Register of Historic Places in Arkansas
Buildings and structures completed in 1891
Buildings and structures in Phillips County, Arkansas
National Register of Historic Places in Phillips County, Arkansas
Neoclassical architecture in Arkansas
Cemeteries established in the 1890s